Sonya Smith is an American actress best known for her roles in telenovelas.

Biography 
Smith was born in Philadelphia, Pennsylvania, of German-born Venezuelan actress Ileana Jacquet and Frederick Smith, who is American. Her maternal great-grandfather was French and her maternal great-grandmother was Finnish. After her parents divorced, her actress mother along with Smith went back to Venezuela; Smith grew up in Venezuela and identifies herself with the Venezuelan culture. She speaks fluent Spanish, English, and German; the last learned from her mother, a German who grew up in Venezuela. She studied psychology at the Universidad Central de Venezuela.

She also has a nursing degree.

Career 
Her breakthrough came in the early 1990s when she played Estrellita Montenegro, the main character in Cara Sucia, her most successful telenovela as the lead actress. Smith remains a popular actress not only in Venezuela, also in other countries where her telenovelas have shown. In 2006, she returned to telenovelas with Olvidarte Jamás, her biggest hit as the lead actress since Cara Sucia, which was shot in Miami; this is the time where Smith returned to her birth country, but this time in Miami. Later, in 2007, she reappeared in Acorralada, in which she was one of the main stars and which has been a huge success. There, she was Fedora Gaviota.

During 2005, Smith made her Hollywood debut, playing Angela La Salle in Cyxork 7, where she acted alongside Ray Wise; although Smith currently lives in the United States and appeared in a Hollywood film, she still wants to remain more in the Spanish media of the country because the Spanish media opened opportunities for her to fame. In 2007, she participated in another Hollywood film, Ladrón que roba a Ladrón, where she shared credits with actors, Fernando Colunga, Gabriel Soto, Miguel Varoni, and Saúl Lisazo among others.

Filmography

Film

Television roles

Awards 
Latin Pride National Awards (for Outstanding Woman Achievement, 2008)
Miami Life Award (2011)

References 

Entrevista con Luis Olavarrieta "La vida no me dió hijos"

External links 
Sonya Smith Biography

Sonya Smith official page

1972 births
Living people
Actresses from Philadelphia
American emigrants to Venezuela
American people of Finnish descent
American people of French descent
American people of German descent
American people of Venezuelan descent
American telenovela actresses
Hispanic and Latino American actresses
Naturalized citizens of Venezuela
RCTV personalities
Venezuelan expatriates in the United States
Venezuelan film actresses
Venezuelan people of American descent
Venezuelan people of Argentine descent
Venezuelan people of French descent
Venezuelan people of Finnish descent
Venezuelan people of German descent
Venezuelan Protestants
Venezuelan telenovela actresses
American people of Colombian descent